Dušan Jarjabek (born 4 March 1953 in Bratislava) is a baryton singer of opera and operetta as well as pop music, vocal coach and politician. He has served as a member of the National Council since 1998.

Music and teaching career 
Jarjabek studied signing at the Academy of Performing Arts in Bratislava, graduating in 1976. Afterward, he spent one year at the Teatro del Parco in Palermo. 

In1980-1991 he was a singer at the New Scene theater.  In 1996-1998 he was the director of the New Scene. Since 1985 he has  been a singer at the Slovak National Theater Opera ensemble. 

In addition to performing, Jarjabek  has taught singing at the Academy of Performing Arts since 1988.

Political career 
Jarjabek was elected an MP of the National Council in 1998 on the Movement for a Democratic Slovakia list, which he joined to express his support for the nationalistic policies of Vladimír Mečiar. In 2005 he left the party and joined the Direction – Slovak Social Democracy over his dissatisfaction with what he perceived as tolerance of the government.

References 

Baritones
Slovak opera singers
Direction – Social Democracy politicians
People's Party – Movement for a Democratic Slovakia politicians
Slovak politicians
Living people
1953 births
Members of the National Council (Slovakia) 1998-2002
Members of the National Council (Slovakia) 2002-2006
Members of the National Council (Slovakia) 2006-2010
Members of the National Council (Slovakia) 2010-2012
Members of the National Council (Slovakia) 2012-2016
Members of the National Council (Slovakia) 2016-2020
Members of the National Council (Slovakia) 2020-present
Musicians from Bratislava
Politicians from Bratislava